JiveBop Dance Party TV Show is an American dance-based television program created by American Top 40 disc jockey and nightclub operator Alan White.

Early life
White was born in Bridgeport, Connecticut on October 27, 1941. He is the only child of Ray E. & Doris P. White. During his youth, the family would later relocate to Torrington in northwestern Connecticut. As a youngster, Alan was a student at Rumsey Hall School from 1952 until his graduation in 1956.

Musician
White dropped out of high school in 1957, and worked various jobs in and around Torrington. In his late teenage years, he also performed in a number of local bands that served the triangle including northwestern Connecticut, Eastern New York state and Western Massachusetts. From 1960 through 1963, Alan drummed for Turk and The Party Cats alongside Turk Coury (vocals & guitar) and Michael 'Mike' Stoffi (guitar).

Radio and Nightclub Disc Jockey

 

In 1964, at the age of 24, Alan began working at WHVW AM 950 (known as 'Live 95') in Hyde Park, N.Y. While at WHVW, White did a two-hour daily morning news program, a drive-time show from 4PM until station sign-off, and between shows either sold advertising for the station or worked in the studio to produce ads.

While Alan was a disc jockey at WHVW, some students at Vassar College in Poughkeepsie, N.Y. booked him—based on his highly rated afternoon drive show at the local top 40 radio powerhouse Live 95—to DJ a dance at the college promoted under the name 'Discotheque'. The dance was based on the discotheque club concept the students had discovered in Europe the previous summer. This event would become the first known discotheque dance in the United States.

That same year, White and a business partner, Bill DeCesare (the WHVW sales manager), opened the first discotheque in the United States, the Rumpus Room Nightclub & Discotheque, in Dover Plains, N.Y.

In deejaying professionally from a booth at the club, White unintentionally became the first professional nightclub DJ in America in 1965.

Booking Agent

From 1966 until 1967, White worked, first as a concert promoter in North Carolina, and later as a theatrical booking agent in Washington, D.C.

He served as an agent at Paramount Artists Corporation, and represented (among others):

 The British Walkers
 Little Willie & the Hand Jives
 The Chartbusters
 Dee Dee Sharp
 The Kalin Twins
 Jimmy Jones
 The Crystals
 The Shangri-Las
 Len Barry

In late 1967, White departed Paramount in Washington, and moved to Action Talents agency at 1650 Broadway in New York City. Action Talents was an agency that received financing and support from Neil Bogart of Buddah Records fame.

While at Action Talents, Alan represented a number of the biggest pop acts of the period, including The Lemon Pipers (Green Tambourine), The Ohio Express (Yummy Yummy Yummy (I've Got Love In My Tummy)), The 1910 Fruitgum Company (Simon Says, 1, 2, 3, Red Light), Joey Dee and the Starliters (Peppermint Twist, Hot Pastrami with Mashed Potatoes), The Music Explosion (Little Bit O'Soul), The Five Stairsteps and Cubie, (O-o-h Child), Johnny Maestro and The Crests (16 Candles, The Angels Listened In, Trouble in Paradise, Step By Step), The Del Satins (a vocal quartet made famous on the local New York City-based Clay Cole Show), Jordan Christopher and The Wild Ones, The Kasenetz-Katz Singing Orchestral Circus and The Peppermint Rainbow (Will You Be Staying After Sunday?).

Alan became an integral at Betty Sperber's Action Talents agency, and is said to have coined the name for the act The Brooklyn Bridge; a supergroup merging Johnny Maestro (whom Sperber personally managed), The Crests and The Del Satins. When the band was first introduced to the public, it happened in an appearance on the Brooklyn Bridge featuring the 12-piece band, Bogart, Sperber and the Mayor of Brooklyn, N.Y.

The Disco Era

Talent Manager

In 1969, White moved to Philadelphia to become personal manager and booking agent for his friend, 1960s rock and roll star and former Dovells lead singer Len Barry. At the time, Barry was producing what would become the first two disco records; Who Can I Turn To and a cover of Johnnie Ray's 1950s classic, Cry, both by Atlanta R&B singer Grover Mitchell.

While neither record was a hit, the next Barry-produced dance recording was Keem-O-Sabe by The Electric Indian and that became the first disco record ever to hit the national charts, reaching number 16 on the Billboard Hot 100 in August 1969.

During this period, White managed Barry's career as Len continued to produce new music in addition to performing. His core group of studio musicians at the time included performers like Vince Montana, Daryl Hall, John Oates, Bobby Eli, and Earl Young; some of whom would go on to success either on their own, or as part of groups like MFSB (TSOP), The Trammps (Disco Inferno) and Hall & Oates.

Nightclub DJ

Eventually, Alan changed directions and returned to radio. From 1972-1973, he served as a sidekick to Peter 'The Flying Dutchman' Berry of Baltimore's WFBR 1300 AM. Berry's morning show on "Mad Radio 13"—as it was known at the time—consistently dominated the Baltimore market.

In addition to working in radio, White also provided marketing and consulting services for restaurants and nightclubs. In 1975, while performing at Emerson's Restaurant in downtown Baltimore, he was presented with a proclamation by then-Mayor William Donald Schaefer naming White "The Evening Mayor of Baltimore," in appreciation of his contributions to bringing nighttime business back into Baltimore's downtown.

By 1974, he had also returned to deejaying in nightclubs, and played and programmed music in a variety of nightclubs along the East Coast. He settled in Atlanta, Georgia in 1977 and would perform at several noted Atlanta venues during the heyday of disco, such as Harlows, Jeryl's, and Johnny's Hideaway.

Alan White would receive a gold record for his promotional efforts which helped nationally break Jim Burgess's 12" remix of Alicia Bridges' I Love the Nightlife in 1978.

In the early 1980s, he would record a couple of novelty records. However, White continued to enjoy performing in nightclubs and would settle into a position as music director and headline DJ at Atlanta's Johnny's Hideaway. He would serve there in this capacity until the mid-1990s.

The Swing Revival

In 1998, White began to DJ and promote dance events for young Atlanta-area swing dancers, who had become caught up in a resurgence of interest in swing music and dancing which would later come to be known as the swing revival or the Neo-Swing movement. This trend was led musically by artists like Brian Setzer, Big Bad Voodoo Daddy, Squirrel Nut Zippers and Indigo Swing.

In 2001, Alan—along with web designer Dr. Clio Soleil—launched an internet radio station called SwingTop40.com, which featured a weekly Top 40 countdown show, with songs voted upon by reporting swing DJs from around the world. In 2002, SwingTop40 would partner with SwingAwards.com to digitally produce the first of two 'imaginary' special broadcasts that served as a formal awards program for the swing music industry.

When SwingTop40 ceased production in April 2003, a total of 103 weekly Swing Top 40 Countdown shows had been broadcast, and are currently archived online. These archived programs serve as a detailed historic record of the swing music revival of the late 1990s and early 2000s.

On Memorial Day weekend of 2005, Alan White was inducted into the Swing DJs Hall of Fame.

Present Day

Alan currently lives in Chamblee, Georgia and continues to DJ and promote dance events in the Atlanta area. Mr. White is divorced, and the father of two sons: Zachary and Alan White, Jr.

He also presently runs a Modern Jive dance promotion company called JiveBop and a related internet radio station—JiveBopRadio.com—playing music optimized for Modern Jive dancers. A television dance party show called the JiveBop Dance Party TV Show is currently in pre-production.

References

External links
 Jive Bop Radio (streaming programming)
 The archived radio programs of SwingTop40.com
 Alan White's professional homepage
 Origins of Disco #1, including historical information
 Origins of Disco #2, including historical information
 Origins of Disco #3, including historical information

American music television series
English-language television shows